Tyler Municipal Airport  is an airport located 1 mile north west of Tyler, Minnesota, United States. The airport has a single lighted turf runway and rotating beacon. The taxiways are also lighted.

History 
The airport underwent an improvement in 1999 to correct drainage issues. The nearby golf course was expanded to 18 holes at the same time.

References

External links 
 

Airports in Minnesota
Transportation in Lincoln County, Minnesota
Buildings and structures in Lincoln County, Minnesota